Diogo José Gonçalves da Silva (born 8 July 1986) is a Brazilian footballer who plays as a goalkeeper for CRB.

Honours 
Nova Iguaçu
 Copa Rio: 2008

Vasco da Gama
 Copa do Brasil: 2011
 Campeonato Carioca: 2016

Luverdense
Copa Verde: 2017

References

External links

1986 births
Living people
People from Cuiabá
Brazilian footballers
Association football goalkeepers
Campeonato Brasileiro Série A players
Campeonato Brasileiro Série B players
Campeonato Brasileiro Série C players
Mesquita Futebol Clube players
Bangu Atlético Clube players
Nova Iguaçu Futebol Clube players
CR Vasco da Gama players
Esporte Clube XV de Novembro (Piracicaba) players
Luverdense Esporte Clube players
Ceará Sporting Club players
Clube de Regatas Brasil players
Sportspeople from Mato Grosso